State Route 311 (SR 311) is a north-south state highway located in the southwest part of the U.S. state of Georgia.

Route description
SR 311 begins at an intersection with SR 97/SR 309 in Bainbridge. The route heads northeast through rural parts of Decatur County before entering Mitchell County. Farther to the northeast, SR 311 intersects SR 65 west of Hopeful. SR 311 curves around Hopeful until it meets its northern terminus, an intersection with SR 97 just northeast of Hopeful.

History

Major intersections

See also

References

External links

311
Transportation in Decatur County, Georgia
Transportation in Mitchell County, Georgia